Joan Huydecoper van Maarsseveen may refer to:

Joan Huydecoper van Maarsseveen (1599–1661) 
Joan Huydecoper II (1625–1704), his son